Brazil elects on the national level a head of state—the president—and a legislature. The president is elected to a four-year term by absolute majority vote through a two-round system. The National Congress (Congresso Nacional) has two chambers. The Chamber of Deputies (Câmara dos Deputados) has 513 members, elected to a four-year term by proportional representation. The Federal Senate (Senado Federal) has 81 members, elected to an eight-year term, with elections every four years for alternatively one-third and two-thirds of the seats. Brazil has a multi-party system, with such numerous parties that often no one party has a chance of gaining power alone, and so they must work with each other to form coalition governments.

Schedule

Election

Inauguration

Electoral systems

A presidential candidate in Brazil needs to gain fifty per cent plus one of votes to be named as winner. A second-round runoff is mandated if no candidate receives fifty per cent plus one of votes.

Deputies are elected to the Chamber of Deputies using a form of party-list proportional representation known as the open list. Seats are distributed in 27 multi-member constituencies based on the Federation Units (26 States and the Federal District), ranging from 8 to 70 seats. Seats are allocated through the D'Hondt method. 

Senators are elected to the Federal Senate with a plurality of the vote in a first-past-the-post system, which is not proportional. Three senators are elected for each state and for the Federal District.

In lower levels of government, the state legislative assemblies and city councils are elected using an open list proportional representation system. Seats are allocated using a version of the D'Hondt method where only parties who receive at least V/n votes (where V is the total number of votes cast and n is the total number of seats to be filled) may win seats in the legislature.

Voting in Brazil is compulsory for all literate citizens over 18 and under 70, and optional for citizens who are aged 16 and 17, older than 70 or illiterate. Brazil introduced compulsory voting into its Electoral Code in 1932 and lowered the voting age from 18 to 16 in the 1988 constitution. The 1988 constitution also granted voluntary suffrage to the illiterate citizens of Brazil.

Brazilian voting machines

Presidential elections by party

2022 general election

Presidential election

Parliamentary election

Chamber of Deputies

Federal Senate

Election results 1982–2018

Brazilian legislative elections (Chamber of Deputies), 1982–2018

Source: 
Source:

Referendums
Brazil has held three national referendums in its history. In the first, held on January 6, 1963, the people voted for the re-establishment of the presidential system of government (82% of valid ballots), which had been modified by a constitutional amendment in 1961. A second referendum, as ordered by the Federal Constitution of 1988, was held on April 21, 1993, when the voters voted for a republican form of government and reaffirmed the presidential system.

A third national referendum, on the prohibition of the commerce of personal firearms and ammunition, was held on October 23, 2005. The ban proposal was rejected by 64% of the electorate.

See also
 Electoral calendar
 Electoral system
 List of political parties in Brazil
 List of senators in Brazil

Notes

References

External links
Adam Carr's Election Archive
Simulated voting machine (Portuguese) Courtesy of the Brazilian Superior Electoral Court website. (Java required)
Brief history of electronic voting in Brazil 
Brazil: The Perfect Electoral Crime (II)  (Security analysis of the Brazilian voting machines by James Burk, Oct. 21, 2006)
Electoral Law of Brazil
Inelegibility Law of Brazil

 
Government of Brazil